Gomal River is a  river in Afghanistan and Pakistan. It rises in the northern part of Afghanistan's Paktika Province. It joins the Indus River 20 miles south of Dera Ismail Khan, Khyber Pakhtunkhwa.

The river lends its name to the Gomal University in Dera Ismail Khan and the like-named Gomal District in Paktika Province.

Etymology
The name Gomal is thought to have derived from the river Gomati, which is mentioned in the Rigveda.

Course
Gomal River's headwaters are located in the northern part of Paktika Province, southeast of the city of Ghazni. The springs which form the headwaters of the Gomal's main branch emerge above the fort at Babakarkol in Katawaz, a district in Paktika inhabited by Ghilji Pashtuns from the Kharoti and Sulaimankhel clans. The Gomal's other branch, the "Second Gomal", joins the main channel about 14 miles below its source. The Gomal flows southeast through the eastern Ghilji country before entering Khyber Pakhtunkhwa, Pakistan.

Within Pakistan, the Gomal River forms the boundary between South Waziristan and Balochistan. After approximately 110 miles from its source, it merges with the Zhob River, its major tributary, near Khajuri Kach.

It is about 100 miles from the Zhob River to the Indus River. The river enters the Gomal Valley in Tank District at a place known as Girdavi, which is inhabited by the Miani Pashtuns. It is mainly here that the water of Gomal is used to cultivate the lands in the Gomal Valley through Zam System (Rod Kohi). The river passes then through the Damaan plain in Kulachi Tehsil and later on through Dera Ismail Khan Tehsil. It joins the Indus River 20 miles south of the city of Dera Ismail Khan.

Gomal Zam Dam

The daming of this river at Khajuri Kachh was envisaged as back as 1898, even after its administrative approval by the Government of Pakistan in 1963. Work on the Gomal Zam Dam was stopped in 1965; not to restart till 2001 during the rule of Pervez Musharraf. while it was opened and inaugurated in 2013.

There is also a street in E-7, Islamabad called the "Gomal Road".

See also
Gomal Zam Dam
Gomal Pass
Gomal District
Gomal University
Zhob River
South Waziristan
Paktika Province

Notes

Further reading

External links

 Gomal River marked on the OpenStreetMap
https://web.archive.org/web/20071026033718/http://www.khyber.org/places/2005/TheGomalRiver.shtml

Rivers of Afghanistan
Rivers of Balochistan (Pakistan)
Rivers of Khyber Pakhtunkhwa
Tributaries of the Indus River
International rivers of Asia
Rigvedic rivers
Landforms of Ghazni Province
Landforms of Paktika Province
Rivers of Pakistan